The 2020–21 Ohio State Buckeyes women's basketball team represented the Ohio State University during the 2020–21 NCAA Division I women's basketball season. The Buckeyes, led by eighth year head coach Kevin McGuff, played their home games at Value City Arena and the Covelli Center.  They were members of the Big Ten Conference.

They finished the season 13–7, 9–7 in Big Ten play to finish in seventh place. They did not participate in the Big Ten women's basketball tournament, NCAA tournament or the WNIT due to a self-imposed postseason ban.

Previous season
The Buckeyes finished the season 21–12, 11–7 in Big Ten play to finish in a tie for fifth place. As the sixth seed in the Big Ten women's basketball tournament the defeated Minnesota, Iowa, and Michigan before losing to Maryland in the finals. They did not get a chance for further post season play, as the NCAA women's basketball tournament and WNIT were cancelled before they began due to the COVID-19 pandemic.

Roster

Schedule and results

Source:

|-
!colspan=6 style=| Non-conference regular season

|-
!colspan=6 style=| Big Ten regular season

Rankings

See also
 2020–21 Ohio State Buckeyes men's basketball team

References

Ohio State Buckeyes women's basketball seasons
Ohio State
Ohio State Buckeyes
Ohio State Buckeyes